The 2004 Volvo PGA Championship was the 50th edition of the Volvo PGA Championship, an annual professional golf tournament on the European Tour. It was held 27–30 May at the West Course of Wentworth Club in Virginia Water, Surrey, England, a suburb southwest of London.

Scott Drummond won by two strokes ahead of Ángel Cabrera.

Course layout

Past champions in the field 
Nine former champions entered the tournament.

Made the cut

Missed the cut

Nationalities in the field

Round summaries

First round 
Thursday, 27 May 2004

Second round 
Friday, 28 May 2004

Third round 
Saturday, 29 May 2004

Final round 
Sunday, 30 May 2004

Scorecard

Cumulative tournament scores, relative to par

Source:

References 

BMW PGA Championship
Golf tournaments in England
Volvo PGA Championship
Volvo PGA Championship
Volvo PGA Championship